Manoba punctilineata is a moth in the family Nolidae. It was described by George Hampson in 1896. It is found in the north-eastern Himalayas and Myanmar, as well as on Borneo, the Philippines and Sulawesi.

References

Moths described in 1896
Nolinae